Coal River is a river in Mackenzie District, Canterbury, New Zealand. The river flows westward from the Two Thumb Range into the northern end of Lake Tekapo.

See also
List of rivers of New Zealand

References

Rivers of Canterbury, New Zealand